Queensferry Lifeboat Station is an RNLI station located in the town of South Queensferry within the boundary of the city of Edinburgh, Scotland in the United Kingdom. The station is currently equipped with an  lifeboat the Jimmy Cairncross (RNLI Number B-851) on station since 6 September 2012.

Location 
The current station is located at the Hawes pier just west of the Forth Rail Bridge.  The station provides a marine search and rescue service on the River Forth covering the area upstream and downstream of South Queensferry. It complements the flanking station at Kinghorn.  The present boathouse and station facilities were constructed and opened in 2012.

Awards

 1974 A Framed Letters of Thanks signed by the Chairman of the Institution, Major General Ralph H Farrant CB, awarded to the crew R Mackay, J Smith and G McAlpine for the rescue of a man in very severe conditions when his small dinghy was washed onto the Swallow Craig rock on 8 December.
 2010 For services to the Institution, Thomas James Robertson, the former Lifeboat Operations Manager and current chairman, was honoured by Her Majesty the Queen's Birthday Honours with an MBE.
 2016 Donald Quate was presented with the Long Service Award for his dedication over the years to the charity, joining the station as a volunteer in 1976 as a crew member then helmsman and now Deputy Launch Authority.

References 

Lifeboat stations in Scotland
South Queensferry